The  (M2) in Brisbane, Queensland, Australia, is a major motorway route and southern bypass of Brisbane.
  (M2) Northern Ipswich Bypass (Warrego Highway) from Brassall to Dinmore
  (M2) Ipswich Motorway from Dinmore to Gailes
  (M2) Logan Motorway from Gailes to Drewvale
  (M2) Gateway Motorway from Drewvale to Eight Mile Plains

Major intersections
Each of the articles on the component roads contains a road junction list.

See also

References

Brisbane Metroads